Calhoon cartridges are a class of .19 in (4.85 mm) caliber cartridges created by James Calhoon, a firearms designer with an interest in that bore size. Calhoon began working with .19 caliber after his interest was piqued from learning about British sub-caliber rifle trials in the early 1970s.  The .19 caliber rifles have thicker rifling than .17 and .20 caliber rifles, which helps the barrels stay clean longer and improves barrel life.

Variants

.19 Calhoon Hornet
The .19 Calhoon Hornet is a .19 caliber rifle wildcat cartridge. The cartridge is based on a necked-down blown-out .22 Hornet cartridge. This provides less stretching, and greater case capacity with a lighter bullet. The result is a flatter trajectory when compared to the .22 Hornet. Having a larger bore than the .17 caliber centerfires helps mitigate some of the fouling problems that rifles in that caliber tend to have.

.19-223
The .19-223 is the second in a set of .19 caliber rounds created by James Calhoon. The cartridge is based on a necked-down .223 Remington cartridge. This gives higher velocity and a flatter trajectory than would be found with typical .223 loads.

.19 Badger
The .19 Badger is the third (currently in 2007 the latest) of the .19 caliber rounds created by Calhoon. This was an attempt to take the best features of his earlier cartridges the .19 Calhoon Hornet and the .19-223 and create a very powerful and efficient cartridge. This cartridge is based on the rimless .30 M1 Carbine case, which has almost the same rim diameter as a .22 Hornet but has fewer potential feeding problems in some rifles because of the lack of a rim.

See also
List of firearms
List of rifle cartridges
5 mm caliber

References

Subcaliber Stinger By Jim Matthews
.19-223 Dimensions
Calhoon's Amazing .19 Caliber

External links
Calhoon Website

Calhoon cartridges
Cartridge families
Wildcat cartridges